Calabar Kingdom may refer to:
Kalabari Kingdom, a city state of the Kalabari People in what is now Rivers State, Nigeria
Akwa Akpa, a city state of the Efik people based on what is now the city of Calabar